Ivo Stefanoni (born 5 June 1936) is an Italian rowing cox and Olympic champion.

Stefanoni was born in Mandello del Lario in 1936, and he rowed with GS Moto Guzzi.

At the 1956 European Rowing Championships, Stefanoni won a bronze medal with the coxed four. Later that year, he received a gold medal in the coxed four event at the 1956 Summer Olympics in Melbourne, together with Alberto Winkler, Angelo Vanzin, Romano Sgheiz and Franco Trincavelli.

For the 1957 European Rowing Championships, Stefanoni changed to the eight and won gold; he repeated this success at the 1958 European Rowing Championships. At the 1960 Summer Olympics, he won the bronze medal with the Italian boat in the coxed four competition.

For the 1961 European Rowing Championships, Stefanoni was back in the eight and they won gold. Three rowers from the 1961 crew remained with the Italian eight that competed at the 1964 Summer Olympics and came sixth: Giampietro Gilardi, Sereno Brunello and Stefanoni.

References

1936 births
Living people
Italian male rowers
Olympic rowers of Italy
Olympic gold medalists for Italy
Olympic bronze medalists for Italy
Rowers at the 1956 Summer Olympics
Rowers at the 1960 Summer Olympics
Rowers at the 1964 Summer Olympics
Olympic medalists in rowing
Medalists at the 1960 Summer Olympics
Medalists at the 1956 Summer Olympics
Coxswains (rowing)
European Rowing Championships medalists
People from Mandello del Lario